The Woman in Flames is a 1924 German silent thriller film directed by Carl Boese and starring Asta Nielsen, Alfred Abel, and Gregori Chmara.

It was shot at the Bavaria Studios in Munich. The film's sets were designed by the art director Hans Sohnle and Otto Erdmann.

Cast
Asta Nielsen as Josefine
Alfred Abel as Hans Fennhofer
Gregori Chmara as Stanislaus, Diener
Helene von Bolváry as Ein Straßenmädchen
Lia Eibenschütz as Lisa
Valeska Goldberger as Dame
Erwin Fichtner as Fennhofers Chauffeur
Henry Bender as Bellmann, Regisseur

References

External links

Films of the Weimar Republic
German silent feature films
Films directed by Carl Boese
German black-and-white films
Bavaria Film films
Films shot at Bavaria Studios
1920s thriller films
German thriller films
Silent thriller films
1920s German films
1920s German-language films